William Melish may refer to:
 William Howard Melish, American Episcopalian and social leader
 William Bromwell Melish, president of Bromwell Brush and Wire Goods in Cincinnati